Theeram Thedunnavar is a 1980 Indian Malayalam film,  directed by P. Chandrakumar and produced by Sankar Bhatt and N. Chakrapani. The film stars Prem Nazir, Sukumaran and Seema in the lead roles. The film has musical score by M. S. Viswanathan.

Cast
Prem Nazir
Sukumaran
Seema

Soundtrack
The music was composed by M. S. Viswanathan and the lyrics were written by Sathyan Anthikkad.

References

External links
 

1980 films
1980s Malayalam-language films
Films scored by M. S. Viswanathan
Films directed by P. Chandrakumar